The Cameroonian Women's Championship, called since the 2020–21 season Guinness Super League because of sponsorship, is the top flight of women's association football in Cameroon. The competition is run by the Cameroonian Football Federation.

History
The championship was created in 1990. From this year to 2007 only regional leagues were played with the regional champions meeting in Yaoundé for the national title. The first national league in its new format was played in 2008.

Champions
The list of champions and runners-up:

Most successful clubs

See also
 Cameroonian Women's Cup

References

External links 
 Guinness Super League - FECAFOOT official website

 
Women's association football leagues in Africa
Women's football competitions in Cameroon
Women
1990 establishments in Cameroon
Sports leagues established in 1990